The Bakewell Show is an agricultural show held annually in August at Bakewell, Derbyshire, England. It is organised by the Bakewell Agricultural and Horticultural Society. The show has its own permanent show ground in Bakewell, where other events are held throughout the year.

The show scheduled for 8 and 9 August 2020 together with other events were cancelled due to restrictions associated with COVID-19.

History
The Scarsdale and High Peak Agricultural Society was founded in 1819 and held the first show in Chesterfield on 5 July 1819. In 1827 the society was renamed the Derbyshire Agricultural Society, and over the years the organisation running the show took various names until acquiring its current name in 1929. The 1883 show was cancelled because of foot and mouth disease, and shows were cancelled between 1915 & 1918, 1940 to 1945 & 2020. In 1980 the show became a two-day event. In 2001 the show went ahead despite another foot and mouth epidemic, but included no animals. The 2015 event was the 185th show, 196 years after the first.

References

External links 

Agricultural shows in England
1819 establishments in England
Recurring events established in 1819
Bakewell